The 2022 UCI Europe Tour was the eighteenth season of the UCI Europe Tour. The 2022 season began on 23 January 2022 with the Clàssica Comunitat Valenciana 1969, and concluded on 16 October 2022 with the Chrono des Nations and the Veneto Classic.

Throughout the season, points are awarded to the top finishers of stages within stage races and the final general classification standings of each of the stages races and one-day events. The quality and complexity of a race also determines how many points are awarded to the top finishers, the higher the UCI rating of a race, the more points are awarded.

The UCI ratings from highest to lowest are as follows:
 Multi-day events: 2.Pro, 2.1 and 2.2
 One-day events: 1.Pro, 1.1, 1.2, and Criterium Pro (CRTP)

On 1 March 2022, the UCI cancelled all events that would have taken place in Russia and Belarus, due to the Russian invasion of Ukraine; the only event impacted by this was the Five Rings of Moscow, originally scheduled for 8–12 June.

Events

January

February

March

April

May

June

July

August

September

October

Notes

References

External links 
 

 
UCI Europe Tour
2022 in men's road cycling
2022 in European sport